Newport is a city in Lincoln County, Oregon, United States. It was incorporated in 1882, though the name dates back to the establishment of a post office in 1868. Newport was named for Newport, Rhode Island. As of the 2010 census, the city had a total population of 9,989, an increase of nearly 5% over its 2000 population; as of 2019, it had an estimated population of 10,853.

The area was originally home to the Yacona tribe, whose history can be traced back at least 3000 years. White settlers began homesteading the area in 1864. The town was named by Sam Case, who also became the first postmaster.

Newport has been the county seat of Lincoln County since 1952, when voters approved a measure to move the center of government from nearby Toledo to Newport. It is also home of the Oregon Coast Aquarium, Hatfield Marine Science Center, Nye Beach, Yaquina Head Light, Yaquina Bay Light, Pacific Maritime Heritage Center and Rogue Ales, and is notable as the western terminus of U.S. Route 20, the longest road in the United States.

Geography

Climate
Newport has mild, wet weather throughout the year with the heaviest precipitation falling during the winter months.

There are an average of 187 days a year with precipitation equalling or exceeding . Average annual snowfall is only .

In October 1962, wind gusts at Newport reached  before the wind gauge stopped working. This occurred during the Columbus Day Windstorm, which the National Weather Service has named one of Oregon's top 10 weather events of the 20th century.

Another top-10 event affecting Newport occurred in December 1964, when a rainstorm caused severe flooding in many parts of the state. The Weather Service rated the storm among the most severe in western Oregon since the 1870s. About  of rain fell on Newport. This was almost twice the normal amount expected in December and set a new record for the city.

Also in the Weather Bureau's top-10 list for Oregon are the snowstorms of January 1950. Newport saw a total of about  fall during the month, four times its normal annual snowfall.

Demographics

2010 census
As of the census of 2010, there were 9,989 people, 4,354 households, and 2,479 families living in the city. The racial makeup of the city was 84.1% White, 0.6% African American, 2.1% Native American, 1.6% Asian, 0.2% Pacific Islander, 7.5% from other races, and 3.9% from two or more races. Hispanic or Latino of any race were 15.3% of the population.

There were 4,354 households, of which about 25% had children under the age of 18 living with them, 41% were married couples living together, 11% had a female householder with no husband present, 5% had a male householder with no wife present, and 43% were non-families. About 35% of all households were made up of individuals, and about 15% had someone living alone who was 65 years of age or older. The average household size was about 2.2 and the average family size was about 2.8.

The median age in the city was about 43 years. About 20% of residents were under the age of 18, 8% were between the ages of 18 and 24, 24% were from 25 to 44, 29% were from 45 to 64, and 19% were 65 years of age or older. The gender makeup of the city was 49.1% male and 50.9% female.

2000 census
As of the census of 2000, there were 9,532 people, 4,112 households, and 2,495 families living in the city. The population density was about 1,073 people per square mile (414.5/km2). The racial makeup of the city was about 88.6% White, 2.2% Native American, 1.7% Asian, 0.5% Black or African American, and 0.2% Pacific Islander. About 3.9% were of other races and 3% from two or more races. Hispanic or Latino of any race were about 9% of the population.

Of 4,112 households, about 27% had children under the age of 18 living with them, 47% were married couples living together, 13% had a female householder with no husband present, and 39% were non-families. About 32% of all households were made up of individuals, and 13% had someone living alone who was 65 years of age or older. The average household size was about 2.3 and the average family size was about 2.8.

In the city, the population was spread out, with about 22% under the age of 18, 8% from 18 to 24, 26% from 25 to 44, 27% from 45 to 64, and 17% who were 65 years of age or older. The median age was 41 years. For every 100 females, there were 95.6 males. For every 100 females age 18 and over, there were 92 males.

The median income for a household in the city was $31,996, and the median income for a family was $36,682. Males had a median income of $31,416 versus $26,582 for females. The per capita income for the city was $20,580. About 12.2% of families and 14.4% of the population were below the poverty line, including 17.1% of those under the age of 18 and 8.2% of those 65 and older.

Economy

In August 2011, the National Oceanic and Atmospheric Administration moved its base for research ships from Seattle to Newport. The base boasts about 110 marine officers and a total of 175 employees. It bases four ships, including the NOAAS Bell M. Shimada and the NOAAS Rainier, and it provides support for up to two itinerant vessels. NOAA has personnel at the Hatfield Marine Science Center which support the fisheries science centers for Alaska and the Northwest. The ships join the R/V Oceanus and R/V Elakha research vessels based at the center.

Education
Lincoln County voters established Oregon Coast Community College in 1987, in which year the college held its first classes.
The public schools in Newport are part of the Lincoln County School District, and include Newport High School, Newport Preparatory Academy, Newport Intermediate School, and Sam Case Primary School.

Newport is also home to the Hatfield Marine Science Center, operated by Oregon State University in collaboration with state and federal agencies. The center conducts research and educational programs associated with the marine environment and serves as a primary field station for the university's College of Oceanic and Atmospheric Sciences.

Media

Radio stations
Newport has several locally-based stations: 
 KPPT 100.7FM (Classic Hits)
 KNPT 1310AM (News/Talk)
 KYOR 88.9FM (Religious)
 K210CW/KLOV 89.9FM (Christian Contemporary)
 KLCO 90.5FM (Public Radio/Lane Community College)
 K217FZ/KWAX 91.3FM (Classical)
 KNCU 92.7FM (Country)
 K239BO/KRLZ 93.7FM (Hot AC)
 KWPB/LPFM 98.7FM (Religious)
 K295BJ/KOGL 106.9FM (Public Radio)

Newspaper
The News-Times is published twice a week, and daily on newportnewstimes.com.

Sister City
Newport has one sister city:
 Mombetsu, Japan

Notable people

Sam Adams, former Mayor of Portland, Oregon
Scott Baker, marine biologist at the Marine Mammals Institute
Nathan Ball, mechanical engineer, entrepreneur, TV host, and author
Rick Bartow, artist
Ernest Bloch, composer and humanist
Joel Hedgpeth, marine biologist
David Ogden Stiers, actor

See also

Jumpoff Joe, a former rock pillar on Nye Beach
Newport Municipal Airport
Steamboats of the Oregon Coast
Yaquina Bay
Yaquina Head, a rocky headland

References

External links

Listing for Newport in the Oregon Blue Book
Greater Newport Chamber of Commerce
Newport Tourism Website
Port of Newport International Terminal Project web page

 
Cities in Oregon
County seats in Oregon
Cities in Lincoln County, Oregon
Populated places established in 1882
Port cities in Oregon
1882 establishments in Oregon
Populated coastal places in Oregon